Anuphap Theeraratsakul (born 4 October 1979) is a Thai badminton player who specializes in singles. He won the men's singles title at the Thai national championships in 1998 and 2002, and at the same year, he represented his country at the 1998 and 2002 Asian Games. Theeraratsakul helps the Thai national team won the silver medal at the 2003 Southeast Asian Games, also the bronzes in 1997, 1999, and 2001. Together with his brother Apichai and Anurak, they found the T.Thailand badminton club.

Achievements

IBF International 
Men's singles

References

External links
 
 

Living people
1979 births
Anuphap Theeraratsakul
Badminton players at the 1998 Asian Games
Badminton players at the 2002 Asian Games
Anuphap Theeraratsakul
Competitors at the 1997 Southeast Asian Games
Competitors at the 1999 Southeast Asian Games
Competitors at the 2001 Southeast Asian Games
Competitors at the 2003 Southeast Asian Games
Anuphap Theeraratsakul
Anuphap Theeraratsakul
Southeast Asian Games medalists in badminton
Anuphap Theeraratsakul